Hemieleotris is a genus of small fishes in the family Eleotridae native to Central America and Colombia, where they are only found in freshwater habitats.

Species
The recognized species in this genus are:
 Hemieleotris latifasciata (Meek & Hildebrand, 1912) (pygmy sleeper)
 Hemieleotris levis C. H. Eigenmann, 1918

References

Eleotridae